The top quark, sometimes also referred to as the truth quark, (symbol: t) is the most massive of all observed elementary particles. It derives its mass from its coupling to the Higgs Boson. This coupling  is very close to unity; in the Standard Model of particle physics, it is the largest (strongest) coupling at the scale of the weak interactions and above. The top quark was discovered in 1995 by the CDF and DØ experiments at Fermilab.

Like all other quarks, the top quark is a fermion with spin  and participates in all four fundamental interactions: gravitation, electromagnetism, weak interactions, and strong interactions. It has an electric charge of + e. The antiparticle of the top quark is the top antiquark (symbol: , sometimes called antitop quark or simply antitop), which differs from it only in that some of its properties have equal magnitude but opposite sign.

The top quark interacts with gluons of the strong interaction and is typically produced in hadron colliders via this interaction. However, once produced, the top (or antitop) can decay only through the weak force. It decays to a W boson and either a bottom quark (most frequently), a strange quark, or, on the rarest of occasions, a down quark.

This is about a twentieth of the timescale for strong interactions, and therefore it does not form hadrons, giving physicists a unique opportunity to study a "bare" quark (all other quarks hadronize, meaning that they combine with other quarks to form hadrons and can only be observed as such).

As such, the top quark's properties are extensively studied as a means to discriminate between competing theories of new physics beyond the Standard Model. The top quark is the only quark that has been directly observed due to its decay time being shorter than the hadronization time.

History
In 1973, Makoto Kobayashi and Toshihide Maskawa predicted the existence of a third generation of quarks to explain observed CP violations in kaon decay. The names top and bottom were introduced by Haim Harari in 1975, to match the names of the first generation of quarks (up and down) reflecting the fact that the two were the "up" and "down" component of a weak isospin doublet.

The proposal of Kobayashi and Maskawa heavily relied on the GIM mechanism put forward by Sheldon Glashow, John Iliopoulos and Luciano Maiani, which predicted the existence of the then still unobserved charm quark. (The other second generation quark, the strange quark, was already detected in 1968.) When in November 1974 teams at Brookhaven National Laboratory (BNL) and the Stanford Linear Accelerator Center (SLAC) simultaneously announced the discovery of the J/ψ meson, it was soon after identified as a bound state of the missing charm quark with its antiquark. This discovery allowed the GIM mechanism to become part of the Standard Model. With the acceptance of the GIM mechanism, Kobayashi and Maskawa's prediction also gained in credibility. Their case was further strengthened by the discovery of the tau by Martin Lewis Perl's team at SLAC between 1974 and 1978. The tau announced a third generation of leptons, breaking the new symmetry between leptons and quarks introduced by the GIM mechanism. Restoration of the symmetry implied the existence of a fifth and sixth quark.

It was in fact not long until a fifth quark, the bottom, was discovered by the E288 experiment team, led by Leon Lederman at Fermilab in 1977. This strongly suggested that there must also be a sixth quark, the top, to complete the pair. It was known that this quark would be heavier than the bottom, requiring more energy to create in particle collisions, but the general expectation was that the sixth quark would soon be found. However, it took another 18 years before the existence of the top was confirmed.

Early searches for the top quark at SLAC and DESY (in Hamburg) came up empty-handed. When, in the early 1980s, the Super Proton Synchrotron (SPS) at CERN discovered the W boson and the Z boson, it was again felt that the discovery of the top was imminent. As the SPS gained competition from the Tevatron at Fermilab there was still no sign of the missing particle, and it was announced by the group at CERN that the top mass must be at least .

The Tevatron was (until the start of LHC operation at CERN in 2009) the only hadron collider powerful enough to produce top quarks. In order to be able to confirm a future discovery, a second detector, the DØ detector, was added to the complex (in addition to the Collider Detector at Fermilab (CDF) already present). In October 1992, the two groups found their first hint of the top, with a single creation event that appeared to contain the top. In the meantime, DØ had found no more evidence than the suggestive event in 1992.

In the years leading up to the top-quark discovery, it was realized that certain precision measurements of the electroweak vector boson masses and couplings are very sensitive to the value of the top-quark mass. These effects become much larger for higher values of the top mass and therefore could indirectly see the top quark even if it could not be directly detected in any experiment at the time. It is the development of techniques that ultimately allowed such precision calculations that led to Gerardus 't Hooft and Martinus Veltman winning the Nobel Prize in physics in 1999.

Properties
 At the final Tevatron energy of 1.96 TeV, top–antitop pairs were produced with a cross section of about 7 picobarns (pb). The Standard Model prediction (at next-to-leading order with  = ) is 6.7–7.5 pb.
 The W bosons from top quark decays carry polarization from the parent particle, hence pose themselves as a unique probe to top polarization.
A first measurement of the top quark charge has been published, resulting in some confidence that the top quark charge is indeed .

Production
Because top quarks are very massive, large amounts of energy are needed to create one. The only way to achieve such high energies is through high-energy collisions. These occur naturally in the Earth's upper atmosphere as cosmic rays collide with particles in the air, or can be created in a particle accelerator. In 2011, after the Tevatron ceased operations, the Large Hadron Collider at CERN became the only accelerator that generates a beam of sufficient energy to produce top quarks, with a center-of-mass energy of 7 TeV. There are multiple processes that can lead to the production of top quarks, but they can be conceptually divided in two categories: top-pair production, and single-top production.

Top-quark pairs 

The most common is production of a top–antitop pair via strong interactions. In a collision, a highly energetic gluon is created, which subsequently decays into a top and antitop. This process was responsible for the majority of the top events at Tevatron and was the process observed when the top was first discovered in 1995. It is also possible to produce pairs of top–antitop through the decay of an intermediate photon or Z-boson. However, these processes are predicted to be much rarer and have a virtually identical experimental signature in a hadron collider like Tevatron.

Single top quarks 

The production of single top quarks via weak interaction is a distinctly different process. This can happen in several ways (called channels): Either an intermediate W-boson decays into a top and antibottom quarks ("s-channel") or a bottom quark (probably created in a pair through the decay of a gluon) transforms to a top quark by exchanging a W boson with an up or down quark ("t-channel"). A single top quark can also be produced in association with a W boson, requiring an initial-state bottom quark ("tW-channel"). The first evidence for these processes was published by the DØ collaboration in December 2006, and in March 2009 the CDF and DØ collaborations released twin articles with the definitive observation of these processes. The main significance of measuring these production processes is that their frequency is directly proportional to the  component of the CKM matrix.

Decay

The only known way the top quark can decay is through the weak interaction, producing a W boson and a bottom quark.
Because of its enormous mass, the top quark is extremely short-lived, with a predicted lifetime of only . As a result, top quarks do not have time before they decay to form hadrons as other quarks do.
The absence of a hadron surrounding the top quark provides physicists with the unique opportunity to study the behavior of a "bare" quark.

In particular, it is possible to directly determine the branching ratio .

The Standard Model also allows more exotic decays, but only at one loop level, meaning that they are extremely rare. In particular, it is conceivable that a top quark might decay into another up-type quark (an up or a charm) by emitting a photon or a Z-boson. However, searches for these exotic decay modes have produced no evidence that they occur, in accordance with expectations of the Standard Model. The branching ratios for these decays have been determined to be less than 1.8 in 10000 for photonic decay and less than 5 in 10000 for Z boson decay at 95% confidence.

Mass and coupling to the Higgs boson
The Standard Model generates fermion masses through their couplings to the Higgs boson.  This Higgs boson acts as a field filling space. Fermions interact with this field in proportion to their individual coupling constants  which generates mass.  A low-mass particle, such as the electron has a minuscule coupling  while the top quark has the largest coupling to the Higgs,  These couplings are usually called the Higgs–Yukawa couplings, and they vary slowly as the energy scale at which they are measured is varied, due to a quantum effect called the renormalization group.

In the Standard Model, all of the quark and lepton Higgs–Yukawa couplings are small compared to the top-quark Yukawa coupling. This hierarchy in the fermion masses remains a profound and open problem in theoretical physics. Higgs–Yukawa couplings are not fixed constants of nature, as their values vary slowly as the energy scale (distance scale) at which they are measured. This dynamics of Higgs–Yukawa couplings, called "running coupling constants", is due to a quantum effect called the renormalization group.

The Higgs–Yukawa couplings of the up, down, charm, strange and bottom quarks are hypothesized to have small values at the extremely high energy scale of grand unification,  GeV. They increase in value at lower energy scales, at which the quark masses are generated by the Higgs. The slight growth is due to corrections from the QCD coupling. The corrections from the Yukawa couplings are negligible for the lower-mass quarks.

One of the prevailing views in particle physics is that the size of the top-quark Higgs–Yukawa coupling is determined by a unique nonlinear property of the renormalization group equation that describes the running of the large Higgs–Yukawa coupling of the top quark. If a quark Higgs–Yukawa coupling has a large value at very high energies, its Yukawa corrections will evolve downward in mass scale and cancel against the QCD corrections. This is known as a (quasi-) infrared fixed point, which was first predicted by B. Pendleton and G.G. Ross and by C.T. Hill. No matter what the initial starting value of the coupling is, if sufficiently large, it will reach this fixed-point value. The corresponding quark mass is then predicted.

The top-quark Yukawa coupling lies very near the infrared fixed point of the Standard Model. The renormalization group equation is:
 

This equation describes how the Yukawa coupling changes with energy scale . Solutions to this equation for large initial values  cause the right-hand side of the equation to quickly approach zero, locking  to the QCD coupling .

The value of the top quark fixed point is fairly precisely determined in the Standard Model, leading to a top-quark mass of 220 GeV. This is about 25% larger than the observed top mass and may be hinting at new physics at higher energy scales.

The quasi-infrared fixed point subsequently became the basis of top quark condensation theories of electroweak symmetry breaking, in which the Higgs boson is composite at extremely short distance scales, composed of a pair of top and antitop quarks. The predicted top-quark mass comes into improved agreement with the fixed point if there are additional Higgs scalars beyond the standard model and may be indicating that a rich spectroscopy of new Higgs fields lies at energy scales that can be probed with the LHC and its upgrades.

See also
CDF experiment
Quark model
Top quark condensate
Topcolor
Topness

Footnotes

References

Further reading

External links 
 
 
 
 
 
 
 
 
 

Elementary particles
Quarks
Standard Model